Daraunda or Duraundha/Daraundha is a Community development block in district of Siwan, in Bihar state of India. It is one out of 6 blocks of Maharajganj Subdivision. The headquarter of the block is at Daraunda town.

The block is divided into many Village Councils and villages.

Panchayats
The block is divided into many Gram panchayats (Village councils).

Bagoura
Bal Bangara
Chherahi
Harsar
Jalalpur
Karsaut
Kathua Sarangpur
Korari Kala
Marasara
Pakawalia
Pandeypur
Pinarthu Khurd
Ramgarha
Ramsapur
Rasulpur
Rukundipur
Sirsawn

See also
Maharajganj Subdivision
Administration in Bihar

References

Community development blocks in Siwan district